Black Roses is a 1935 German historical drama film directed by Paul Martin and starring Lilian Harvey, Willy Fritsch and Willy Birgel. A separate English-language version Black Roses was also made with Harvey reprising her role opposite Esmond Knight. She also starred in a French version. The film was Harvey's comeback in German cinema, following her attempt to at Hollywood and then British films. One source suggested that Harvey paid for the English version of the film to be made out of her own money, as she still hoped to break into the English-speaking market.

The film was popular in Germany, partly because it re-teamed Harvey with Fritsch who was constantly romantically linked with her in the media. In fact Harvey was in a long-term relationship with the film's director Paul Martin. Despite the film's success, Harvey quickly moved away from melodrama to the lighter comedy romances that had originally made her name.

It was shot at the Babelsberg Studios in Berlin with location shooting around Harburg a borough of Hamburg. The film's sets were designed by the art directors Erich Kettelhut and Max Mellin. The premiere took place at the Gloria-Palast.

Synopsis
When Finland was still part of the Russian Empire, a Finnish Revolutionary battling Czarist agents is assisted by a Russian dancer Tania Feorovna, who eventually gives her life for her lover.

Partial cast
 Lilian Harvey as Tania Fedorovna
 Willy Fritsch as Erkki Collin
 Willy Birgel as Fürst Abarow
 Gerhard Bienert as Niklander
 Gertrud Wolle as Die Wirtschafterin
 Klaus Pohl as Polizeiagent
 Heinz Wemper as Kosak Iwanoff
 Franz Klebusch as Fischer
 Ullrich Klein as Offizier
 Kurt von Ruffin as 1. Adjutant
 Hermann Frick as 2. Adjutant

Reception 
The Österreichische Film-Zeitung reported in its edition of December 27, 1935: "Paul Martin staged the film, which is rich in gripping scenes and whose exciting plot is well structured, with a great deal of sensitivity for what is cinematically effective. Scenes of oppressive drama are delightfully staged, or ballet pictures full of grace."

Paimann's Filmlisten found: "The plot slows down a bit after an excellent start, but increases noticeably towards the end. It has its most essential support in the leading couple. The dialogue is sparse, apt and is underlined by shot-rich camera work. Schröder's music is used with moderation, the presentation ... authentic (turn of the century)...".

References

Bibliography

External links 
 

1935 films
Films of Nazi Germany
German historical drama films
German black-and-white films
1930s historical drama films
1930s German-language films
Films directed by Paul Martin
Films set in Finland
Films set in the 1900s
German multilingual films
UFA GmbH films
1935 multilingual films
1935 drama films
Films shot at Babelsberg Studios
Films shot in Hamburg
1930s German films